Dream is the second studio album by Canadian singer, Michael Bublé. The album was released in Canada in June 2002, preceding the release of his debut label album. Bublé re-recorded the track "Dream" for his 2007 album Call Me Irresponsible, and also recorded the track "Stardust" for his 2009 albums Michael Bublé Meets Madison Square Garden and Crazy Love. The Crazy Love version features vocals from Naturally 7.

Track listing

2002 albums
Michael Bublé albums